The generalized gamma distribution is a continuous probability distribution with two shape parameters (and a scale parameter). It is a generalization of the gamma distribution which has one shape parameter (and a scale parameter). Since many distributions commonly used for parametric models in survival analysis (such as the exponential distribution, the Weibull distribution and the gamma distribution) are special cases of the generalized gamma, it is sometimes used to determine which parametric model is appropriate for a given set of data. Another example is the half-normal distribution.

Characteristics
For non-negative x from a generalized gamma distribution, the probability density function is

where  denotes the gamma function.

The cumulative distribution function is

where  denotes the lower incomplete gamma function, 
and  denotes the regularized lower incomplete gamma function.

The quantile function is then given by inverting  using known relations about inverse of composite functions, yielding:

Related distributions 

 If  then the generalized gamma distribution becomes the Weibull distribution.  
 If  the generalised gamma becomes the gamma distribution. 
 If  then it becomes the exponential distribution. 
 If  and  then it becomes the Nakagami distribution. 
 If  and  then it becomes a half-normal distribution. 

Alternative parameterisations of this distribution are sometimes used; for example with the substitution α  =   d/p. In addition, a shift parameter can be added, so the domain of x starts at some value other than zero. If the restrictions on the signs of a, d and p are also lifted (but α = d/p remains positive), this gives a distribution called the Amoroso distribution, after the Italian mathematician and economist Luigi Amoroso who described it in 1925.

Moments
If X has a generalized gamma distribution as above, then

Properties
Denote GG(a,d,p) as the generalized gamma distribution of parameters a, d, p.
Then, given  and  two positive real numbers, if , then
 and
.

Kullback-Leibler divergence

where  is the digamma function.

Software implementation
In the R programming language, there are a few packages that include functions for fitting and generating generalized gamma distributions. The gamlss package in R allows for fitting and generating many different distribution families including generalized gamma (family=GG).

See also
 Half-t distribution
 Truncated normal distribution
 Folded normal distribution
 Rectified Gaussian distribution
 Modified half-normal distribution
 Generalized integer gamma distribution

References

Continuous distributions
Gamma and related functions